Park Ji-young (born December 25, 1980), professionally known as Kahi, is a South Korean singer, dancer, and actress known for her work as a former leader of South Korean girl group After School. As of June 2012, Kahi graduated from After School and continued her career as a solo singer and actress with Pledis before her contract ended in January 2015.

Early life
Kahi was born in Daegu on December 25, 1980. She was raised by her grandparents. She found her passion for dancing when she was 16 and also around this time became fascinated by the hip hop group Roo'ra, which would motivate her to become a singer. However, due to family opposition and practical conditions, she could not receive professional training, so during high school, she trained herself in singing and dancing. Her father prevailed upon her to go to a university in a rural area. At first, she obeyed his wishes, however, she was unable to endure being a college student and eventually left her hometown to pursue a dancing career. She did not speak with her father for the next seven years. She went to Seoul alone and without funds. One day a friend took her to an interview to be a backup dancer. She did well at the audition and got the job. She started her dancing career at age 18.

Career

2000–2007: Dancing and S.Blush
In 2000, Kahi was chosen as the main dancer for DJ Doc's mega-hit, "Run to You". However, this instant success also brought her huge stress and eventually forced her to leave for a period of time. To make an income, she worked as a cleaner, waitress, and sales clerk. A choreographer in SM Entertainment gave her a chance to become a temporary dancer for BoA, which became a full-time position. She gradually gained fame as a dancer and her work with BoA lasted more than three years. Besides BoA, she was also an important backup dancer for Country Kko Kko, Jinusean, 1TYM, Lexy, Chae Yeon, Eun Ji Won, and many others. She was also the dance teacher for Son Dam Bi, May Doni, and Kim Jung Ah, her former bandmate.

Around 2006, after more than five years career as a professional dancer, she began working also as a singer. She joined the Korean American girl group "S. Blush", whose first digital single peaked at No. 2 on the Billboard Hot Dance Chart in May 2007. However, due to various reasons, the band soon disbanded.

2007–2012: Debut with After School
In late 2007, Kahi contacted some friends in the industry at Pledis Entertainment. Together, they planned for and produced a new group. In January 2009, after years of work and selection of members, the group After School was introduced. After School would undergo many member changes and image changes, but Kahi remained as the leader. Rumours of her leaving the group had begun as early as 2010 when Pledis Entertainment initially announced she would release a solo album. In 2010, Kahi joined the cast of reality-variety series Yeongunghogeol ("Heroes").

The promotional campaign for Kahi's solo debut started in mid-February 2011, with the album jacket photos released on February 9 and a teaser video on February 12. The album photos were noted for highlighting the singer's "S-line", while netizens and news articles commented on the contrasting "black vs. white" images and "charisma" in the teaser. The mini-album was then released on February 14, 2011. The music video for "Come Back, You Bad Person" was released on February 14, 2011 and Kahi began promotional activities on 18th. In early 2012, Kahi was cast in Dream High 2, playing a teacher at Kirin Art School.

2012–present: Solo career
In June 2012, it was announced Kahi would be leaving After School to pursue a solo singing and acting career. In March 2013, Kahi was rumoured to be having a solo comeback, but it was put on hold. Later over a year from her last solo release, Pledis Entertainment announced on September 25, 2013 that Kahi would be releasing her second mini album, titled "Who Are You?", on October 10.

In 2014, Kahi acted as the lead role of Bonnie in the musical and Korean adaptation of Bonnie & Clyde alongside ZE:A's Hyungsik. Following After School's sixth anniversary in January 2015, Kahi announced that she was leaving Pledis Entertainment. In 2016, she was a dance trainer on the girl group survival show Produce 101. In late 2016, it was announced that she would return as a judge and dance trainer for the male version of Produce 101 titled Produce 101 Season 2. In June 2018, she also became a one-day dance trainer/judge for Produce 48.

Personal life
On March 26, 2016, Kahi married entrepreneur Yang Jun-mu (CEO of Incase Korea) in a private ceremony in Hawaii. In May 2016, Kahi announced that she and her husband were expecting their first child. On October 3, Kahi gave birth to a son, Yang No-ah. Kahi welcomed a second son, Yang Si-on, on June 16, 2018.

Discography

Compilation albums

Extended plays

Singles

Collaborations

Music videos

Writing credits
 After School - "When I Fall" (2009)
 After School - "With U" (2010)
 Suki - "One Love" (2010)
 Son Dam-bi - "Beat Up by a Girl" (2010)
 After School - "Someone Is You" (2010)
 Kahi - "Slow" (2013)
 Kahi - "Sinister" (2013)
 Kahi - "Hey Boy"(2013)

Filmography

Variety shows

TV drama

Musical

Awards

References

External links

Kahi on Instagrm

After School (band) members
1980 births
Living people
People from Daegu
K-pop singers
South Korean female idols
South Korean dance musicians
South Korean women pop singers
South Korean television actresses
South Korean musical theatre actresses
Pledis Entertainment artists
Seokyeong University alumni
21st-century South Korean singers
21st-century South Korean women singers